Bucculatrix artemisiella is a species of moth of the family Bucculatricidae. It is found in most of Europe (except Ireland, the Mediterranean islands and the Balkan Peninsula). It was first described by Gottlieb August Wilhelm Herrich-Schäffer in 1855.

The wingspan is 7–8 mm.

The larvae feed on Artemisia campestris. They mine the leaves of their host plant. The larvae slit the margin of the leaf, and from there make a ribbon-shaped fleck mine that appears as a transparent seam along the leaf margin.

External links
Fauna Europaea
bladmineerders.nl
Swedish Moths

External links
Images representing Bucculatrix artemisiella at Consortium for the Barcode of Life

Bucculatricidae
Moths of Europe
Moths described in 1855
Taxa named by Gottlieb August Wilhelm Herrich-Schäffer
Leaf miners